Hlyniany Gate (Polish: Brama Gliniańska; Ukrainian: Глинянська брама) is the focal point of the few remaining fortifications in Lviv, Ukraine. It was built in 1618 to Fryderyk Getkant's designs in order to defend the approach from Hlyniany. The outer moat and the wooden galleries on the inside are the upshot of a 1970s reconstruction. Just beyond the gate is the Bernardine monastery.

References
 Трегубова Т. О., Мих Р. М. Львів: Архітектурно-історичний нарис. Київ: Будівельник. С. 54.

Buildings and structures in Lviv
Gates in Ukraine
Tourist attractions in Lviv